Seaford House, originally called Sefton House, is a former aristocratic mansion and the largest of the detached houses sited on each corner of  Belgrave Square, London, England.  It is a magnolia stucco building with four main storeys most famed for its interiors (the first floor, or piano nobile, being decorated in the French style).

Dating from 1842, Sefton House was designed by Philip Hardwick to meet the requirements of 3rd Earl of Sefton. The house, with its railings and gate piers, have been listed Grade II* for their architectural merit. The 3rd and 4th Earls used it as their town house; the 5th Earl, being an invalid, could not do so and after he died childless in 1901, the lease was sold to William Tebb.

Lord Howard de Walden, who was also Baron Seaford, acquired the lease for Sefton House in 1902 and renamed it Seaford House. He installed friezes, panelling, and a staircase of green onyx specially imported from South America. The house was requisitioned by the wartime Government in 1940, and for a while was used as offices by the Air Ministry. It was badly damaged by aerial bombing in October 1940, and rebuilt thereafter (but without the porte-cochere).  In 1946, the house became the home of the Imperial Defence College, now the Royal College of Defence Studies. 

Seaford House is usually open to the public free of charge on Open House Weekend each September.  But it can also be seen on screen.  The main vestibule doubled as Titanic'''s Grand Staircase in the 1979 miniseries SOS Titanic. It was also used in the filming of Upstairs, Downstairs.  Seaford House later stood in as the exterior of the home of Maggie Gyllenhaal's character Nessa Stein in the BBC and SundanceTV television miniseries The Honourable Woman in 2014.  It can also be seen (doubling as the US Embassy) in the 2021 film The King's Man''*.

References

5 https://thecinemaholic.com/where-was-the-kings-man-filmed/

Bibliography

External links
History of Seaford House from the Defence Academy of the United Kingdom
Flickr images tagged Seaford House

Belgravia
Headquarters in the United Kingdom
Houses completed in 1842
Houses in the City of Westminster
Grade II* listed buildings in the City of Westminster
Grade II* listed houses in London